Pál Engel (27 February 1938 – 21 August 2001) was a Hungarian medievalist historian and archivist, and member of the Hungarian Academy of Sciences. He served as General Director of the Library of the Hungarian Academy of Sciences between 1996 and 1997. Despite Engel being an autodidact historian (who had no degree in history), he became a preeminent medievalist, and member of the Hungarian Academy of Sciences.

Works 
Magyarország világi archontológiája, 1301–1457, I–II. ["Secular Archontology of Hungary, 1301–1457, Volume I–II"]. História, MTA Történettudományi Intézete. Budapest (1996)
The Realm of St Stephen: A History of Medieval Hungary, 895–1526. I.B. Tauris Publishers (2001)

Sources 

20th-century Hungarian historians
1938 births
2001 deaths
Writers from Budapest
Historians of Hungary
Members of the Hungarian Academy of Sciences
Burials at Farkasréti Cemetery